Out of Nowhere is an album by jazz saxophonist Sonny Criss recorded in 1975 and originally released on the Muse label.

Reception

AllMusic awarded the album 4 stars with its review by Scott Yanow stating "Criss's distinctive sound, mastery of bop and consistently swinging ideas are three strong reasons to acquire this".

Track listing 
 "All the Things You Are" (Oscar Hammerstein II, Jerome Kern) – 4:01
 "The Dreamer" (Sonny Criss) – 7:03
 "El Tiante" (Dolo Coker) – 6:39
 "My Ideal" (Newell Chase, Leo Robin, Richard A. Whiting) – 3:44
 "Out of Nowhere" (Johnny Green, Edward Heyman) – 5:23
 "Brother, Can You Spare a Dime?" (Jay Gorney, Yip Harburg) – 3:03
 "The First One" (Criss) – 4:40

Personnel 
 Sonny Criss – alto saxophone
 Dolo Coker – piano
 Larry Gales – bass
 Jimmie Smith – drums

References 

Sonny Criss albums
Muse Records albums
1976 albums